Nattakit Butsing (born 2 May 2003) is a Thai footballer currently playing as a forward for Thai League 3 club Bolaven Samut Prakan.

Club career

Early life
Nattakit started playing football in kindergarten, before moving to Samut Prakan province as a child. He went on to sign for Samut Prakan, before being offered a contract with BG Pathum United at the age of fourteen. He spent time at BG Pathum United's Yamaoka Hanasaka Academy, where he was spotted by scouts for the Thailand national youth teams.

Uthai Thani and experience abroad
At the end of the 2020–21 season, Nattakit signed with Uthai Thani. In June 2021 he travelled to Germany to participate as a FC Bayern World Squad player, and spent time playing friendlies for them in Mexico, where he scored three goals in three games.

In August 2021, he signed a new deal with Uthai Thani, before a trial with Spanish La Liga side Getafe.

In December 2021, Nattakit joined Spanish side Unión Adarve, initially being assigned to their under-19 side. Despite this move, Nattakit continued to represent Bayern Munich in youth international friendlies, being called up for a tournament in Brazil in April 2022.

International career
Nattakit has represented Thailand at numerous youth international levels.

References

External links
 FC Bayern World Squad profile

2003 births
Living people
Nattakit Butsing
Nattakit Butsing
Thai expatriate footballers
Association football forwards
Nattakit Butsing
Thai expatriate sportspeople in Spain
Expatriate footballers in Spain